Araçá River is a river of Amazonas state in north-western Brazil. It is a tributary of the Demini River, which in turn is a tributary of the Rio Negro.

See also
List of rivers of Amazonas

References

Rivers of Amazonas (Brazilian state)